The Citadel Bulldogs basketball teams represented The Citadel, The Military College of South Carolina in Charleston, South Carolina, United States.  The program was established in 1900–01, and has continuously fielded a team since 1912–13.  Their primary rivals are College of Charleston, Furman and VMI.

1959–60

|-
|colspan=7 align=center|1960 Southern Conference men's basketball tournament

1960–61

|-
|colspan=7 align=center|1961 Southern Conference men's basketball tournament

1961–62

|-
|colspan=7 align=center|1962 Southern Conference men's basketball tournament

1962–63

1963–64

|-
|colspan=7 align=center|1964 Southern Conference men's basketball tournament

1964–65

|-
|colspan=7 align=center|1965 Southern Conference men's basketball tournament

1965–66

|-
|colspan=7 align=center|1966 Southern Conference men's basketball tournament

1966–67

1967–68

|-
|colspan=7 align=center|1968 Southern Conference men's basketball tournament

1968–69

|-
|colspan=7 align=center|1969 Southern Conference men's basketball tournament

References
 

The Citadel Bulldogs basketball seasons